The Argentina men's national under-19 basketball team represents Argentina in basketball international competitions, and is controlled by the "Confederación Argentina de Basquetbol" (Argentine Basketball Federation)

Accomplishments

FIBA Under-19 World Championship

References

External links
 Selecciones Formativas at CABB
 Archived records of Argentina team participations at FIBA

Under
Men's national under-19 basketball teams